The 1862 Constitution of Liechtenstein was signed into law by Johann II, Prince of Liechtenstein on September 26 at Eisgrub, Moravia. It was heavily influenced by the constitutions of Vorarlberg (1861) and Sigmaringen (1863).

References 
Beattie, David (2004). "Liechtenstein: A Modern History". New York: I. B. Tauris. pgs 27-29
Available at Google Books

1862 in Liechtenstein
History of Liechtenstein
Liechtenstein
Constitution of Liechtenstein
1862 in politics
September 1862 events
1862 documents